No. 154 Helicopter Unit is a Helicopter Unit and is equipped with Mil Mi-17 V5 and based at Srinagar Air Force Station.

History

Assignments
Op Megh Rahat
Op Rahat 2013
Op Meghdoot

Aircraft
Mil Mi-17

References

154